Guilherme Seta de Morais Souza (born December 17, 2002) is a Brazilian actor. He became known from childhood when he played Davi in the remake of the Brazilian telenovela Carrossel, SBT (2012).

Career

The Brazilian actor began his artistic career at the age of just 1 year, participating in a commercial for Pernambucanas, and from this contact with the cameras he never stopped. He made several commercials, including Vanish 2009, Hipercard 2010, Pernambucanas 2010, Telefônica 2011, among others. He was a poster boy for Shopping Vale Sul in São José dos Campos, where he ran a campaign for Christmas 2007 and another for Mother's Day 2008.

In 2010 he made his professional debut as a TV actor on the SBT channel, in a special appearance on the novel Uma Rosa com Amor, and in the same year, he became one of the protagonists of the children's series O Esconderijo Secreto by Discovery Kids, which remained on air until 2013.

In 2012, he played the protagonist of the film Boca in the first phase and was part of the short film Thomás Tristonho. In the same year, he was part of the remake of the telenovela Carrossel do SBT, as the Jew Davi Rabinovich, boyfriend of Maisa Silva character. Through this work on TV, Guilherme became famous and the telenovela Carrossel was shown in more than 90 countries. Still with the character Davi, in 2013 he made the Musical Carrossel at Circo Tihany, the spin-off series Patrulha Salvadora in 2014 and in 2015 and 2016 the films Carrossel: o Filme e Carrossel 2: O Sumiço de Maria Joaquina.

Also in 2016, he played Felipe in the webseries Galera do Condomínio, which contains 10 episodes with more than 17 million views on YouTube's Pik Esconde channel. The following year, this webseries earned the actor's first international career award: Rio webfest Best Child Youth Performance. 

In 2017, he was one of the protagonists of Juacas, the second Brazilian series produced by Disney Channel. On the television channel called RecordTV, he has acted from 2017 to 2021 in 3 successful telenovelas: O Rico e Lázaro, Topíssima and Genesis. In 2022, on HBO Max, the actor debuts the feature film #FameTime, a teen comedy where he plays the protagonist Gabriel, a young man with a dream of being a successful youtuber and who is in love with Bianca.

Filmography

Movies

Television

Internet

Video clips

Theater

Discography

Awards and nominations

References

External links 

2002 births
Living people
Male actors from São Paulo
Brazilian male child actors
Brazilian male telenovela actors
Brazilian male television actors
Brazilian male film actors
Brazilian male stage actors